Einar Stensrud (13 January 1895 – 12 July 1964) was a Norwegian sport wrestler. He was born in Hamar. He competed in Greco-Roman wrestling at the 1920 Summer Olympics, in the middleweight class. He was awarded the King's Cup at the national championships in 1928.

References

External links
 

1895 births
1964 deaths
Sportspeople from Hamar
Olympic wrestlers of Norway
Wrestlers at the 1920 Summer Olympics
Norwegian male sport wrestlers